The Texas leafcutter ant (Atta texana) is a species of fungus-farming ant in the subfamily Myrmicinae. It is found in Texas, Louisiana, and north-eastern Mexico. Other common names include town ant, parasol ant, fungus ant, cut ant, and night ant. It harvests leaves from over 200 plant species, and is considered a major pest of agricultural and ornamental plants, as it can defoliate a citrus tree in less than 24 hours. Every colony has several queens and up to 2 million workers.

Description
Workers measure  in length, and are highly polymorphic. The back of the thorax has three pairs of spines. The ant has a narrow waist and is rusty brown in color. It should also be mentioned: Its closely-related cousin, Atta mexicana has colonies up to 8 Million, and the queen for A. mexicana is larger than the texana queen; however, it should also be mentioned that A. mexicana is only able to have a single queen, while A. texana may have multiple queens (Often 2)

Behavior 
The nuptial flights of A. texana synchronize in regions; the virgin queens and males fly at night.

References

External links
 
 

Atta (genus)
Insects described in 1860
Ant, Texas leafcutter
Ant, Texas leafcutter
Hymenoptera of North America